Jonathan Frederick Tenney (born December 16, 1961) is an American actor. He played Special Agent Fritz Howard in TNT's The Closer and continued in its spinoff Major Crimes.

Early life
Tenney was born in Princeton, New Jersey. His mother, Dr. Lillian Sandra Baum, was a psychiatrist, and his father, Frederick Haworth Tenney, was a research physicist. His maternal grandparents were Polish Jewish immigrants, while his paternal forebears were of English ancestry. He received his B.A. degree from Vassar College in 1984, where he majored in drama and philosophy. He later attended The Juilliard School's Drama Division as a member of Group 19 (1986–1990).

Career 
Tenney made his acting debut in a touring production of Mike Nichols' The Real Thing. He worked steadily on and off-Broadway, and in regional theater. At New York City, his stage credits include Biloxi Blues, The Substance of Fire and The Heiress. He began working on television, starring in a number of short-lived series, including Steven Bochco's Brooklyn South, Kristin Chenoweth's sitcom Kristin, and guest appearances on Cybill, Will & Grace, Murphy Brown, Spenser: for Hire and Get Real. Series with Tenney as a regular were canceled on all four major networks.

From 2005 to 2012, Tenney played Special Agent Fritz Howard, the husband of Deputy Chief Brenda Leigh Johnson (Kyra Sedgwick) in TNT's The Closer. For the 4th season of Lifetime's The Division in 2004, he played Hank Riley. When The  Closer ended he continued to act in its spin-off, Major Crimes, from 2012 to 2018, with Howard becoming an LAPD deputy chief in the third season. Later, he portrayed Dr. Simon Craig, a love interest of Nora Walker (Sally Field) in Brothers & Sisters. In 2013, he starred with Rebecca Romijn in TNT's King & Maxwell, as Sean King, a former Secret Service agent and lawyer who works as a private investigator. The series was canceled after one season. In 2014, he was cast in a recurring role on Shonda Rhimes' drama series Scandal.

Tenney appeared in several films, including the villainous CEO of Benbrook Oil Company in Free Willy 2: The Adventure Home and the friend of Alex Whitman (Matthew Perry) in Fools Rush In. He also starred in small roles for some films, including Tombstone, Beverly Hills Cop III, Nixon, Music from Another Room and the 2009 horror film remake of The Stepfather. He also appeared in John Cameron Mitchell's film, Rabbit Hole. He portrayed Martin Jordan in the 2011 superhero film Green Lantern.

Personal life 
From 1994 to 2003, Tenney was married to Teri Hatcher, with whom he has a daughter, Emerson Rose Tenney. He married producer Leslie Urdang on June 16, 2012.

Filmography

Film

Television

References

External links
 

1961 births
American people of English descent
American people of Polish-Jewish descent
American male film actors
American male stage actors
American male television actors
American male voice actors
Living people
Male actors from New Jersey
People from Princeton, New Jersey
Vassar College alumni
Juilliard School alumni
20th-century American male actors
21st-century American male actors
Jewish American male actors
21st-century American Jews
American Ashkenazi Jews